Wilson dos Santos (born 9 December 1958) is a Brazilian sprinter. He competed in the men's 400 metres at the 1984 Summer Olympics.

References

External links
 

1958 births
Living people
Athletes (track and field) at the 1984 Summer Olympics
Brazilian male sprinters
Olympic athletes of Brazil
Place of birth missing (living people)
20th-century Brazilian people